JoAnna Stansby is an American bridge player.

Bridge accomplishments

Wins
 North American Bridge Championships (7)
 Nail Life Master Open Pairs (1) 1998 
 North American Pairs (1) 2002 
 Freeman Mixed Board-a-Match (1) 2010 
 Machlin Women's Swiss Teams (1) 2005 
 Sternberg Women's Board-a-Match Teams (1) 2004 
 Chicago Mixed Board-a-Match (2) 2001, 2008

Runners-up
 North American Bridge Championships
 Nail Life Master Open Pairs (1) 1999 
 North American Pairs (1) 1997 
 Grand National Teams (1) 2006 
 Wagar Women's Knockout Teams (2) 2004, 2007 
 Sternberg Women's Board-a-Match Teams (2) 1996, 2006 
 Chicago Mixed Board-a-Match (1) 2004

References

External links
 

American contract bridge players
Living people
Year of birth missing (living people)
Place of birth missing (living people)